St. Mary's Church, Longnewton is a Church of England church in the parish of Longnewton, Stockton-on-Tees, Teesside, England. It is part of the benefice of All Saints' Church, Preston-on-Tees.

Church building
It is a small stone building in the Early English style, twice rebuilt, in 1806 and in 1858, and occupying the site of a more ancient church.

There is a nave, chancel, and south aisle; north of the chancel, forming a transept, is the Londonderry mausoleum, within which is a sculptured white marble tomb of the third Marquis of Londonderry. The present building is Grade II* listed.

There was formerly a chantry in this church, dedicated to the Blessed Virgin Mary.

Church Links
The church has links with St. Mary's Church of England Aided Primary School in Longnewton.

References

Longnewton, St Mary's Church
Buildings and structures in the Borough of Stockton-on-Tees
Grade II* listed churches in County Durham